Jayson Julio Aquino Félix (born November 22, 1992) is a Dominican former professional baseball pitcher. He made his Major League Baseball (MLB) debut in 2016 with the Baltimore Orioles.

Career

Colorado Rockies
Aquino signed with the Colorado Rockies as an international free agent on July 2, 2009. He spent his first professional season with the Dominican Summer League Rockies in 2010, posting a 4–3 win–loss record, a 1.02 earned run average (ERA), and 59 strikeouts in 61 innings pitched. He also played the 2011 season with the DSL Rockies, and pitched to an 8–2 record, 1.30 ERA, and 80 strikeouts in 89 innings. In 2012, Aquino pitched for both the DSL Rockies and the Rookie Grand Junction Rockies, posting a combined record of 10–1, a 1.66 ERA, and 110 strikeouts in 108 innings.

In 2013, Aquino was promoted to the Short-Season A Tri-City Dust Devils, and later the Class-A Asheville Tourists. In 14 starts comprising 87 innings, he would go 0–10 with a 4.34 ERA and 73 strikeouts. Aquino was added to the Rockies' 40-man roster on November 20, 2013. In 2014, he played with the Advanced-A Modesto Nuts and the Double-A Tulsa Drillers, posting a combined 5–10 record, a 5.13 ERA, and 83 strikeouts in 107 innings pitched.

Toronto Blue Jays
Aquino was designated for assignment by the Rockies on January 30, 2015, and traded to the Toronto Blue Jays for Tyler Ybarra on February 4, 2015.

On March 8, 2015, the Blue Jays optioned Aquino to the Double-A New Hampshire Fisher Cats. He was designated for assignment on May 5.

Pittsburgh Pirates
On May 10, Aquino was traded by the Blue Jays to the Pittsburgh Pirates for cash considerations.

The Pirates designated Aquino for assignment on July 22, 2015.

Cleveland Indians
The Pirates traded Aquino to the Cleveland Indians for cash on July 29, 2015.

St. Louis Cardinals
The Indians designated him for assignment on December 7, 2015. Aquino was claimed off waivers from the Indians by the St. Louis Cardinals on December 9, 2015.

Baltimore Orioles
Aquino was traded by the Cardinals to the Baltimore Orioles for cash on April 7, 2016. He pitched for the Bowie Baysox of the Class AA Eastern League before he was promoted to the major leagues on July 4, 2016.

Aquino made his first career start in the majors on April 22, 2017, for the Baltimore Orioles against the Boston Red Sox at Oriole Park at Camden Yards. He went six innings, giving up just two runs on six hits and three walks, while striking out two batters. Aquino earned the victory in a 4-2 Orioles win, the first of his Major League career. He elected free agency on November 6, 2017, and signed a new minor league contract with Baltimore on December 22. He was released from the organization on June 19, 2018.

Kansas City T-Bones
On July 19, 2018, Aquino signed with the Kansas City T-Bones of the American Association of Independent Professional Baseball. He was released on August 8, 2018.

New Jersey Jackals
On December 27, 2019, Aquino signed with the New Jersey Jackals of the Frontier League for the 2020 season. However, Aquino did not play in a game due to the cancellation of the Frontier League season because of the COVID-19 pandemic.

Barrie Baycats
On November 23, 2020, Aquino signed with the Barrie Baycats of the Intercounty Baseball League for the 2021 season.

References

External links

1992 births
Living people
Asheville Tourists players
Baltimore Orioles players
Bowie Baysox players
Bradenton Marauders players
Dominican Republic expatriate baseball players in the United States
Dominican Summer League Rockies players
Dunedin Blue Jays players
Grand Junction Rockies players

Kansas City T-Bones players
Lynchburg Hillcats players
Major League Baseball pitchers
Major League Baseball players from the Dominican Republic
Modesto Nuts players
Norfolk Tides players
Sportspeople from San Pedro de Macorís
Salt River Rafters players
Toros del Este players
Tri-City Dust Devils players
Tulsa Drillers players